The zander is a species of fish. Zander can also be a given name, a diminutive of the male given name Alexander, or a surname. It may refer to:

People

Surname
 Benjamin Zander (born 1939), English-American conductor
 Carl Zander (born 1963), former professional American football player
 Christine Zander, American television writer and producer
 Edward Zander (born 1947), American business executive
 Frank Zander (born 1942), German singer and actor
 Friedrich Zander (1887–1933), Russian and Soviet pioneer of rocketry and spaceflight
 Gustav Zander (born 1835), Swedish physician and orthopedist
 Heinz Zander (born 1939), German artist and writer
 John Adolf Fredrik Zander (born 1890), Swedish participant in the 1912 and the 1920 Summer Olympics
 Jörg Zander (born 1964), German Formula One designer
 Luca-Milan Zander (born 1995), German footballer
 Martin Zander (1882?–1925), German World War I flying ace
 Michael Zander (born 1932), British legal scholar
 Richard Zander (anatomist) (born 1884), German anatomist, father of surgeon Paul Zander
 Richard Zander (born 1964), German figure skater
 Robin Zander (born 1953), American musician
 Rudolph Zander (born 1915), Canadian politician
 Solveig Zander (born 1955), Swedish politician
 Udo Zander (born 1959), Swedish organizational theorist
 Walter Zander (born 1898), German lawyer and scholar
 Wilhelm Zander (born 1911), Nazi German military officer
 William Zander (born 1844), American politician

Given name
Zander de Bruyn (born 1975), South African cricketer
Zander Fagerson (born 1996), Scottish rugby union player
Zander Hollander (1923–2014), American journalist 
Zander Horvath (born 1998), American football player
Zander Schloss (born 1961), American musician, actor and composer
Zander Sherman (born 1986), Canadian writer

Diminutive
Alexander (Zander) Blewett III (born 1945), American lawyer
Zander Diamond (born 1985), Scottish footballer
Zander Lehmann (born 1987), television writer
Zander Sutherland (born 1987), Scottish footballer
Zander Wedderburn (born 1935–2017), British psychologist

Fictional characters 
Alexander "Zander" Smith, in the soap opera General Hospital
Zander, protagonist of the 1925 film Zander the Great
Zander Freemaker, in the television series Lego Star Wars: The Freemaker Adventures
Dr. Zander Rice, in the Marvel Universe

Other uses 
Zander, Wisconsin, an unincorporated community
Zander Insurance Group, an American insurance company
 Zander (album), a 1997 album by Scorn

See also
Alexander
Sander (name)
Xander

Lists of people by nickname
Hypocorisms